Wilmer Cabrera may refer to:

Wílmer Cabrera (born 1967), Colombian footballer and manager
Wilmer Cabrera Jr. (born 2000), Colombian footballer
Wilmar Cabrera (born 1959), Uruguayan footballer